Sarah Harding (1981–2021) was an English singer and actress, best known for being a member of the girl group Girls Aloud.

Sarah Harding may also refer to:

 Sarah Harding (lama), Buddhist teacher and translator
 Sarah Harding (printer), Irish printer and publisher
 Dr. Sarah Harding, a character from the novel and film The Lost World: Jurassic Park, see List of Jurassic Park characters
Sarah Harding, a character from the UK television series To Play the King, see List of House of Cards trilogy characters

See also
 Sarah H. Harding House, a historical building in Andover, Massachusetts